Anirban Mukhopadhyay is a marketing scholar associated with the Hong Kong University of Science and Technology. He was Editor-in-Chief of the Journal of Consumer Psychology from 2018 to 2020 and Co-Editor in 2016 and 2017. At HKUST, he served as Associate Provost (Teaching & Learning) from 2020-22 and Associate Dean of the School of Business and Management from 2015-20.

References

Living people
Year of birth missing (living people)
Marketing theorists
Academic staff of the Hong Kong University of Science and Technology
Psychology journal editors